Wang Xiurong (born March 27, 1959) is a retired Chinese rhythmic gymnast.

She competed for China in the rhythmic gymnastics all-around competition at the 1984 Summer Olympics in Los Angeles. She was 23rd in the qualification round and didn't advance to the final.

References

External links 
 

1959 births
Living people
Chinese rhythmic gymnasts
Gymnasts at the 1984 Summer Olympics
Olympic gymnasts of China
20th-century Chinese women